The United States Senate Judiciary Subcommittee on Human Rights and the Law is one of eight subcommittees within the Senate Judiciary Committee. Its creation was announced on February 14, 2021, by chairman Dick Durbin and ranking member Chuck Grassley. Created during the 117th Congress when Democrats took control of the Senate, the subcommittee is chaired by Dianne Feinstein, ranking member is Josh Hawley.

118th Congress

References

Judiciary Senate Human Rights and the Law